Veleropilina euglypta is a species of monoplacophoran, a superficially limpet-like marine mollusc. It is found in the Mid-Atlantic, off the Azores archipelago.

References

Monoplacophora